César Camino (born 12 June 1973) is a Spanish film and television actor.

Filmography

Television

Film

References

External links

1973 births
Living people
Male actors from Madrid
Spanish male television actors
Spanish male film actors
21st-century Spanish male actors